Italy competed at the 2003 World Championships in Athletics in Paris, France from 23 to 31 August 2003.

Medalists

Finalists
The team ranked 13th (with 10 finalists) in the IAAF placing table. Rank obtained by assigning eight points in the first place and so on to the eight finalists (four men and five women).

Results
Italy participated with 47 athletes by winning three medals and placing nine finalists.

Men (25)

Women (22)

References

External links
 The “Azzurri” at the World Championships (from 1983 to 2015)

Nations at the 2003 World Championships in Athletics
World Championships in Athletics
Italy at the World Championships in Athletics